Pakosław  is a village in Rawicz County, Greater Poland Voivodeship, in west-central Poland. It is the seat of the gmina (administrative district) called Gmina Pakosław.

The village has a population of 890.

References

Villages in Rawicz County